Nichita Iurașco is a Moldovan footballer who plays for Milsami Orhei, as a midfielder.

Notes

References

External links

1999 births
Living people
Moldovan footballers
Association football midfielders
FC Zimbru Chișinău players
FC Milsami Orhei players
Moldovan Super Liga players
Moldova youth international footballers
Moldova under-21 international footballers